Porfirije (born Prvoslav Perić; born 22 July 1961) is the current and 46th patriarch of the Serbian Orthodox Church. He was the metropolitan bishop of Zagreb and Ljubljana, from 2014 to 2021. Before that, he was titular bishop of Jegra between 1999 and 2014. He is also a university professor and author of theological works.

Early life and education 
Porfirije (Porphyry) was born as Prvoslav Perić on 22 July 1961, in the town of Bečej, PR Serbia, FPR Yugoslavia (now in Serbia), to Radojka and Radivoj Perić. His family has roots in Derventa, Bosnia and Herzegovina.

He finished primary school in Čurug, and the Jovan Jovanović Zmaj Gymnasium in Novi Sad. He was ordained a monk at Visoki Dečani monastery on 21 April 1985, receiving the monastic name of Porfirije after Porphyrios of Kafsokalivia.

In 1986, Porfirije earned his bachelor's degree in Eastern Orthodox theology from the University of Belgrade, when Bishop Pavle of Raška and Prizren (future Serbian Patriarch) ordained him a hierodeacon at the Holy Trinity Monastery in Mušutište, SAP Kosovo. He attended postgraduate studies at the University of Athens from 1986 until 1990. He earned a doctorate in Athens in 2004, with the thesis Possibility of knowability of God in St. Paul's understanding according to the interpretation of Saint John Chrysostom.

Porfirije speaks Serbian, Greek, English, German and Russian.

Hegumen of Kovilj and Bishop of Jegra (1990–2014) 

On 6 October 1990, upon the blessing of Bishop Irinej Bulović of Bačka, Porfirije joined the Kovilj Monastery in Kovilj, near Novi Sad. On 21 November 1990, he was ordained as hieromonk and became hegumen of the Kovilj Monastery.

Many young monks and novices came to the Kovilj Monastery following him. These were the times when the monastery had become a spiritual center for many young people: intellectuals, artists, actors and rock musicians, especially from Novi Sad and Belgrade. Since then Porfirije has particularly dealt with patients with drug addictions. On 14 May 1999, the Bishops' Council of the Serbian Orthodox Church elected Porfirije as the titular bishop of Jegra, and appointed vicar to the Eparchy of Bačka. In 2005, Porfirije formed a therapeutic community called Zemlja živih, which is recognized as a successful project for drug rehabilitation. Under the leadership of Porfirije, it has more than a hundred residents in camps throughout Serbia at the time being. In 2010, the Bishops' Council entrusted Porfirije to establish military chaplaincy in the Serbian Armed Forces. He was the military chaplain until 2011, whereupon he was a coordinator for cooperation between the Serbian Orthodox Church and the Serbian Army.

Metropolitanate of Zagreb and Ljubljana (2014–present)

Metropolitan of Zagreb and Ljubljana (2014–2021)  
In May 2014, Porfirije was elected metropolitan bishop of Zagreb and Ljubljana, succeeding Jovan Pavlović, and enthroned by Patriarch Irinej on 13 July in the Cathedral of the Transfiguration of the Lord in Zagreb, Croatia.

The Sankt Ignatios College and Sankt Ignatios Foundation awarded him with the Order of Sankt Ignatios on 16 February 2016 in Stockholm, Sweden. He was awarded "for his contribution to the reconciliation of the people in the Balkans and his dedicated work on promoting unity among Christians". In June 2016, Porfirije released his new book titled Zagreb i ja se volimo javno in Zagreb. This book contains selected interviews from July 2014 to February 2016 which he gave as the metropolitan for Politika, RTS, Jutarnji list, Večernji list, HRT, RTV Slovenija, and RTRS.

In 2016, Porfirije attended a gathering of Serbian priests in Chicago, Illinois, where along with other priests, he was filmed singing a song dedicated to the Chetnik commander Momčilo Đujić. This drew criticism from the Croatian public and Porfirije later apologized for this act with an explanation that he did not have "influence to all circumstances," and that "certain media manipulated this event." Also, he stated "that someone these days contributing with outpouring intolerance towards the Serbs, as well as to the deepening of the divide between Croats and Serbs."
Between 2017 and 2020, Porfirije hosted meetings of Zagreb-based intellectuals who discussed social, ethical, and political topics. Held in the Serbian Orthodox Gymnasium in Zagreb, those meetings were colloquially known as Porfirijevi kružoci. Some of attendees were Ivo Josipović, Rada Borić, Vili Matula, Tvrtko Jakovina, Dejan Jović, Dražen Lalić, Milorad Pupovac, and others. 

Porfirije was a member of the Holy Synod of the Serbian Orthodox Church between 2017 and 2019. In January 2019, the Association for Religious Freedom in Croatia on the occasion of the 25th anniversary of its founding awarded Porfirije with a recognition for his peaceful contribution to the promotion of the culture of dialogue and religious freedoms. When Patriarch Irinej fell ill in 2019, Porfirije was seen as one of the main candidates for the position of the next Serbian Patriarch.

During his post as Metropolitan, he tried to "build bridges" between Serbs and Croats. He was a visiting professor at Roman Catholic faculties and established good relations with high-ranking members of the Catholic clergy.

Administrator of the Metropolitanate (2021–present)
Following his inauguration as the new Serbian Patriarch in February 2021, Porfirije became an administrator of the Metropolitanate of Zagreb and Ljubljana until the election of new metropolitan bishop. In May 2021, at the General Bishops' Council meeting the new metropolitan of Zagreb and Ljubljana was not elected, although the new metropolitan of Montenegro and the Littoral, and the new bishop of Valjevo were elected.

Serbian Patriarch (2021–present)

Election and inauguration 

Porfirije was elected Patriarch of the Serbian Orthodox Church on 18 February 2021 at the Bishops' Council's convocation in the Church of Saint Sava, three months after the death of previous patriarch Irinej, becoming the 46th Serbian Patriarch. With 31 out of 39 votes, he was the first of three leading candidates with the most votes from the 30 bishops eligible in the Serbian Orthodox Church, along with Bishop Irinej of Bačka who won 30 votes and Bishop Jefrem of Banja Luka who won 24 votes. In the final phase, the envelope with his name was pulled between three of them from the Gospel by Archimandrite Matej of Sisojevac Monastery. In this way, the Serbian Orthodox Church believes the patriarch is elected by divine intervention, sidelining human interests. As one of the youngest Serbian Orthodox bishops at the time of election, Porfirije is the youngest Serbian Patriarch elected since 1937. Congratulatory letters on the occasion of the election of the new Serbian Patriarch were sent by Ecumenical Patriarch Bartholomew I of Constantinople, Patriarch Theodore II of Alexandria, Patriarch Kirill of Moscow, Patriarch Neophyte of Bulgaria, Patriarch John X of Antioch, Patriarch Daniel of Romania, and Archbishop Anastasios of Albania. Also, the Montenegrin President Milo Đukanović, who stated in the February 2020 interview for AFP that Montenegro needs to have its own Orthodox Church in order to strengthen its national identity and oppose interference from Serbia, sent his congratulations upon election.

Porfirije was enthroned on 19 February 2021 in St. Michael's Cathedral in Belgrade. Patriarchal insignias were handed over to him by Metropolitan Hrizostom of Dabar-Bosnia and Bishop Lukijan of Buda. In his introductory speech Porfirije focused on unity and peace building. He stated that Kosovo and Metohija is in his prayers, and the Serbs in the affected Kosovo and Metohija will be in his first place. Also, he stated that Croatia has become his second homeland, and the people he met there will remain a role model for him in the years to come. The inauguration was attended by numerous government ministers of Serbia, representatives of churches and religious communities in Serbia, and various politicians including Serbian President Aleksandar Vučić. The ceremony was also attended by Milorad Dodik, the chairman and the presiding Serb member of the Presidency of Bosnia and Herzegovina; Željka Cvijanović, the President of Republika Srpska (Serb-majority entity of Bosnia and Herzegovina); Apostolic Nuncio Luciano Suriani; Archbishop Stanislav Hočevar, the Catholic archbishop of Belgrade, Effendi Mustafa Jusufspahić, the Mufti of Serbia; and many other dignitaries such as Prince Filip Karađorđević, a member of the House of Karađorđević. On 20 February, a day following the inauguration, a Holy Synod member and one of the three prime candidates for the new Patriarch election Bishop Irinej of Bačka tested positive for COVID-19.

Porfirije held his formal enthronement to the ancient throne of the Serbian patriarch in the Patriarchal Monastery of Peć on 14 October 2022, five months after the enthronement was postponed due to epidemiological measures in force in Kosovo and Metohija.

As Serbian Patriarch, Porfirije became the head of the Bishops' Council and the Holy Synod of the Serbian Orthodox Church.

Activities 

On 25 February, Porfirije met with Serbian President Vučić. After the meeting he stated that he is not a politician because he thinks that the Serbian Orthodox Church is "a conciliator organism which has the goal to collect, build bridges, dull blades and overcome polarization". On 27 February, Porfirije visited Majske Poljane and Glina, areas affected by the 2020 Petrinja earthquake, and met with the Serb community there. It was his first pastoral visit. On 3 March, Porfirije ended in a self-isolation after being in contact with a COVID-19-positive person. In March and April, Porfirije met with numerous foreign diplomats in Belgrade, such as ambassadors to Serbia of Austria, Belarus, Belgium, Bulgaria, Cyprus, Greece, Hungary, Italy, Israel, Romania, Russia, and Ukraine, as well as British Ambassador Sian MacLeod, U.S. Ambassador Anthony Godfrey, and Cypriot Foreign Affairs Minister Nikos Christodoulides. In November 2021, Porfirije called for religious education to receive the status of a compulsory elective subject.

Porfirije tested positive for the COVID-19 on 11 January 2022.

On 16 May 2022, the Holy Synod of Serbian Orthodox Church released a statement that the situation of the Macedonian Orthodox Church – Ohrid Archbishopric was resolved, ending a schism that started in 1967. The Holy Synod stated that full ecclesiastical autonomy was restored to the Archbishopric under the Patriarchate of Serbia, bringing the MOC-OA fully into communion with the wider Eastern Orthodox world.

On 24 May 2022, during a liturgy between hierarchs of the MOC-OA (including its primate) and the Serbian Orthodox Church in Skopje, Porfirije announced to the faithful that "the Holy Synod of the Serbian Orthodox Church has unanimously met the pleas of the Macedonian Orthodox Church and has accepted and recognized its autocephaly."

On 26 December, Porfirije was denied entry at the Merdare administrative crossing after he attempted to visit the Patriarchate of Peć. The Serbian Armed Forces placed armored vehicles and artilery at Jarinje crossing. Serbian Minister of Internal Affairs, Bratislav Gašić announced that in accordance to orders given by president Aleksandar Vučić, he had ordered full combat readiness of police forces, the Gendarmery, and the Special Anti-Terrorist Unit.

Ecumenism and interfaith dialogue 
On the occasion of the Islamic holiday Eid al-Fitr in May 2021, Porfirije expressed his aspiration to participate in building relations between Orthodox Christians and Muslims.

Positions on morality and politics

Domestic relations 
In March 2021, Porfirije stated that the disputed territory of Kosovo was and remains part of Serbia and that "the referendum about it took place in 1389", referring to the medieval Battle of Kosovo, as well as Serb cultural and spiritual heritage in Kosovo. In May 2021, he met with Serbian Minister of Justice Maja Popović to improve cooperation with the Ministry of Justice in order to protect the heritage of the Serbian Orthodox Church in Kosovo, as well as a social and material position of monasticism.

International relations 

In his first interview for the Croatian Radiotelevision as the Serbian patriarch, Porfirije stated that he experienced the departure from Croatia with a certain sadness and, commenting his administration of the Metropolitanate of Zagreb-Ljubljana, he added that he has a joke saying that he is the patriarch of Belgrade, Zagreb and Ljubljana – Serbs, Croats and Slovenes.

In February 2022 Porfirije announced that the Serbian Orthodox Church would be sending help to the brothers in Ukraine. All donations in the temples collected would be sent to the Ukrainian Orthodox Church (dependent from the Moscow Patriarchate) and its Metropolitan Onufriy, who would help deliver them where needed; it was noted that he excluded the Orthodox Church of Ukraine and its Metropolitan Epifanij, as well as he had avoided mentioning the Russian involvement in the crisis.

Civic service

Privrednik Foundation (2002–present) 
Porfirije has been the president of the Privrednik Foundation in Novi Sad, Vojvodina, Serbia.

Regulatory Authority of Electronic Media (2005–2014)
In 2005, the National Assembly of Serbia elected Porfirije, who was the bishop of Jegra at the time, as a member of the Council of the Republic Broadcasting Agency, later renamed to the Regulatory Authority of Electronic Media. At the council, he was a representative of all churches and religious communities in Serbia.

On 29 July 2008, Porfirije was elected as the new council chairman of the Republic Broadcasting Agency (RRA), succeeding Nenad Cekić.

In 2010, RRA demanded from TV Pink that profanity on the reality show Farma be bleeped. On that issue, Porfirije stated that the profanity escalated so much that the RRA Council was resolved to unconditionally and immediately stop it, without waiting for the end of the procedure. In 2011, he criticized reality television and advocated a ban of live broadcasting of reality television. Later, there was similar issue with another TV Pink-produced reality show Dvor.

In May 2014, Porfirije resigned as the council chairman of the Regulatory Authority of Electronic Media following his election to the Metropolitan of Zagreb and Ljubljana. Goran Karadžić, who was the Porfirije's deputy, succeeded him as the council chairman.

Academic career 
After he earned doctorate from the National and Kapodistrian University of Athens in 2004, Porfirije became a docent at the Department of Catechetic and Pastoral Theology of the Eastern Orthodox Theology Faculty of the University of Belgrade. As a docent, he was re-elected in 2010. In 2015, Porfirije became an associate professor. At that department, he succeeded academician Vladeta Jerotić, with whom he worked closely in several fields for years.

As a professor at the University of Belgrade, Porfirije has been teaching basic studies in Pastoral Theology with Psychology and New Testament Theology, as well as in other subjects at the postgraduate and doctorate programs. He also participated in the initiation and promotion of the Bible Institute at the Eastern Orthodox Theology Faculty.

Distinctions

Titles and styles 

His official title in English is His Holiness the Archbishop of Peć, Metropolitan of Belgrade and Karlovci, and Serbian Patriarch Porfirije; his official form of address in English is His Holiness Porfirije, Serbian Patriarch.

Awards 
 : Recognition (2019) of the Association for Religious Freedom in Croatia
 : Order of Sankt Ignatios (2016) by the Sankt Ignatios Foundation
 : Grand Diploma of Vladimir Matijević (2022) by Srpsko privredno društvo Privrednik

Works
Source: University of Belgrade Faculty of Orthodox Theology
Books
 (2015) Licem k Licu: Biblijsko-pastirska promišljanja o Bogu, čoveku i svetu
 (2016) Zagreb i ja se volimo javno
 (2020) Premudrost u Tajni sakrivena — Ogledi iz Teologije apostola Pavla

Selected articles
 (2011) E ágápe õs sýndesmos ginóskontos kaí ginoskoménoy
 (2012) Kosovo je naš krst
 (2015) Pastirsko prisustvo crkve u srpskom narodu tokom Prvog svetskog rata
 (2019) Pavlovo poimanje pravednosti Božje u tumačenju Svetog Jovana Zlatoustog
 (2019) Misionarski i pastirski rad Svetoga Save
 (2020) Eshatologija apostola Pavla: poslanice Solunjanima i Korinćanima
 (2020) Antropologija Svetog Apostola Pavla

See also 
 List of current Christian leaders
 List of current popes and patriarchs
 List of 21st-century religious leaders

References

External links

 Biography of Patriarch Porfirije at spc.rs
 Biography of Metropolitan Porfirije at mitropolija-zagrebacka.org
Patriarch Porfirije, official Facebook page

1961 births
Living people
People from Bečej
21st-century Eastern Orthodox bishops
Eastern Orthodox theologians
Multilingual writers
Metropolitanate of Zagreb and Ljubljana
National and Kapodistrian University of Athens alumni
Patriarchs of the Serbian Orthodox Church
Recipients of the Order of Sankt Ignatios
Serbian people of Bosnia and Herzegovina descent
Serbian theologians
Academic staff of the University of Belgrade
University of Belgrade Faculty of Orthodox Theology alumni